The Dubla are found mainly in the Gujarat state of India. Minor populations are also found in surrounding states and union territories. They are also known as Talvia or Talvi Rathode.

Origin 

They get their name from the Hindi word dubla, which means a thin person. The Dubla claim that they were Rathore Rajputs, who acquired this nickname on account of their taking to cultivation. They are also known as Halpati, which in Gujarati means a cultivator. The Dubla are found in the districts of Surat, Valsad, Bharuch and Vadodara. 

In Maharashtra the Dubla also claim descent from the Rathore community. The name dubla is also derived from the word durbala, which means a weakling. They are found mainly in Thane District, and speak Gujarati.

Present circumstances 
They are classified as scheduled tribes in 4 states and 2 union territories: Goa, Gujarat, Karnataka, Maharashtra, Dadra and Nagar Haveli and Daman and Diu.

In Gujarat 

The community consist of twenty sub-divisions, the main ones being the Talavia, Rathoria, Vohariya, Damaria, Valsadia, Olpadia, Mandavia, Umberia, Ghanghodia, Khodia, Choria, Ukharia, Baramia, Baria, Narda, Haevia, Thakura, Karcha, Watal, Parsi Dubla and Laldatwala Dubla. These clans are of equal status, and intermarry, except the Talavia, who consider themselves superior to the other clans on account of their Rajput ancestry. The Dubla speak Gujarati. 

The Dubla are marginal cultivators and landless agricultural labourers. They also possess buffaloes, cows and goats and are often involved in selling milk, which is a subsidiary occupation. A small number are petty traders, and are often village shopkeepers. Many Dubla have also moved to Surat and Ahmadabad, where they are employed in the diamond cutting industries.

In Maharashtra 

Dubla society consists of several endogamous sub-divisions which do not marry. Some of their sub-divisions include the Bhahmaniya, Garasia, Karcha, Mandvia, Ratjod, Rajput, and Taravia. Their primary occupation is agriculture. The community is divided between small landowners and landless agricultural labourers. They are Hindu, and customs similar to neighbouring tribal communities such as the Dhodia and Warli.

References

Social groups of Gujarat
Indian castes
Hindu communities
Tribal communities of Gujarat
Tribal communities of Maharashtra
Social groups of Maharashtra